James Daughton (born June 27, 1950) is an American film and television actor who is best known for his role as Gregg Marmalard in National Lampoon's Animal House (1978). Daughton's portrayal of Gregg Marmalard has become iconic in American popular culture as a quintessential brown nosing, snobbish, phony WASP.

Raised in San Diego, California, Daughton had roles early in his career on Marcus Welby, MD, Room 222, Planet of the Apes (TV Series) (as Mikal in the episode "The Tyrant"), Happy Days (as the man who challenges Fonzie to water ski over the shark), and the 1972 western The Revengers (as William Holden's son). He appeared in the television series Barnaby Jones, playing a character named Willie Grand in the April 1973 episode "The Murdering Class".

He also appeared in the 1982 film The Beach Girls, in which he was noted primarily for stripping naked and running into the sea. His other film appearances include Malibu Beach (1978), Swim Team (1979), Blind Date (1984), Spies Like Us (1985), Girlfriend from Hell (1989) and Sorority Boys (2002).

Filmography

Notes

External links 

1950 births
Living people
American male film actors
Place of birth missing (living people)
American male television actors
People from San Diego
Male actors from San Diego